The 1980 Labour Party deputy leadership election took place on 13 November 1980 when incumbent deputy leader Michael Foot was elected leader of the Labour Party, defeating Denis Healey.  Healey was subsequently elected unopposed as deputy leader.

Candidates
 Denis Healey, Shadow Chancellor of the Exchequer, Member of Parliament for Leeds East

Sources
 http://privatewww.essex.ac.uk/~tquinn/labour_party_deputy.htm 

1980
Labour Party deputy leadership election
Labour Party deputy leadership election
Labour Party deputy leadership election